WCEF is a Country formatted broadcast radio station licensed to Ripley, West Virginia, serving Ripley and Jackson County, West Virginia.  WCEF is owned and operated by Baker Family Stations.

External links
 98.3 The Bull Online
 

CEF
Radio stations established in 1981